John Kyme (by 1469 – 1527 or 1528), of London, was an English politician.

He was a Member (MP) of the Parliament of England for London in 1512 and 1515.

References

15th-century births
1528 deaths
English MPs 1512–1514
Members of the Parliament of England for the City of London
English MPs 1515